Emma Eliza Regan (born 4 December 1992) is an Irish actress who has appeared in Irish feature films The Fading Light (2009), Love Eternal (2013), Darkness on the Edge Of Town (2014), and Penance 2018, and on television in Aisling's Diary (2009), Jack Taylor (2012), and Vikings (2020).

Early life and education 
Regan grew up in Moycullen, Connemara, her father an innkeeper of the local pub. Regan trained as a classical ballet and contemporary dancer with Alan Foley, artistic director of Cork City Ballet.  She has studied at Bow Street Academy (formerly The Factory's Actors Studio)  in Grand Canal Dock, Dublin, a creative hub where industry leaders mentor future industry leaders, working alongside Lance Daly, Shimmy Marcus, John Carney and Jim Sheridan.

Theatre 
Regan performed her stage debut at The Abbey Theatre as Mollser in a Wayne Jordon production of The Plough and The Stars in 2010.

Film and television 
In 2007, Regan made her screen début in the Ivan Kavanagh horror film Tin Can Man, opposite Michael Parle; The film went on to win several international awards (including Boundary Breaking Best Feature at the Sydney Underground Film Festival and Melbourne Underground Film Festival) prior to its worldwide release.

In her late teens, she became known for her role as Fiona in the RTÉ drama Aisling's Summer Diary – TV Series created by Dublin-based CR Entertainment which won the best international Teen TV Movie at Kidscreen New York in 2010.

Performances in independent films include Our Wonderful Home,  and The Fading Light (winner of the Jameson Dublin International Film Festival). Further work included the leading role in fantasy film The Shadows, based on a George MacDonald dark fairytale, and directed by Colin Downey. with the Irish Film Board, which premiered at Galway Film Fleadh.

Regan also played schoolgirl Cathy in Love Eternal, directed by Brendan Muldowney which has been adapted from the Japanese novel Loving The Dead by prolific horror author  (The Grudge). Love Eternal won the Fresh Blood Award at the inaugural Black Bear Film Festival in Warsaw. The film premiered earlier in 2013 at the Galway Film Fleadh and has screened at over at over fifty festivals and markets worldwide, including Sitges and Busan, one of the largest film festivals in Asia.

In 2014 she starred with Brian Gleeson in The Irish Western Darkness on the Edge Of Town the first independently funded Irish film to feature at the Sundance Film Festival. The film was later picked up by Netflix for and shown across the United States and Canada.

In 2015, Regan starred in the feature movie Get Up And Go in 2015, starring Peter Coonan and Killian Scott of Irish IFTA award-winning drama Love/Hate, and Irish film Fading Away in 2016.

in 2017, Regan got a taste of other areas of the film industry when writing, directing and acting in her own short film Wild Fire Nights highlighting the problems of troubled and dysfunctional young women like Lila as she portrays in the 17 minute film, which was first shown at the Galway Film Fleadh 2017.

Journalism 
Regan also doubles as a travel and cultural columnist for several publications and outlets, including RTÉ, and others. She wrote daily columns on her experiences at the Cannes Film Festival. She was cover girl on the glossy publication 'Galway Now' magazine in July 2013.

Contemporary art 
Regan collaborated with Sara Hibbert on three pieces -Abonnés Series of stills, Flowers of the Gutter a four-screen video installation and Dancer Somnambulism . These projects have been exhibited in One Marylebone Place in 2010 for Intel's and Jotta Remastered Exhibition, London Design Festival, Orientations: Hoxton Art Gallery in London, CUBE Gallery, Cork Street Gallery in Mayfair, London.

Filmography

Film and video

Television

References

External links
 
 Emma Eliza Regan at Irish Equity
Emma Eliza Regan instagram
Emma Eliza Regan twitter

1992 births
Living people
Actresses from County Galway
Alumni of the Bow Street Academy
Irish stage actresses
Irish film actresses
Irish female dancers
Irish women writers